Mauro Minelli (born 2 April 1981) is an Italian former footballer who played as a defender for Cremonese.

Football career
Minelli started his career in Atalanta, the most famous club near his birth place. He spent 2001–02 season at Lumezzane along with Roberto Previtali. That season he also capped for Italy national under-20 football team at the Under-20 Four Nations Tournament.

In January 2003, he was signed by Verona in co-ownership deal, in exchange with Natale Gonnella. In June 2004, he was bought back by Atalanta but he was loaned to AlbinoLeffe in July, re-joining (former) Atalanta team-mate Mauro Belotti, Joelson, Gabriele Perico and Previtali. In July 2005, AlbinoLeffe bought half of the contractual rights, but bought back by Atalanta again in June 2006.

This time Calcio Catania bought half of its contractual rights in July 2006, where he played his first Serie A season since made his debut against ACF Fiorentina on 1 October 2006.

After he failed to make any appearances in either Coppa Italia or 2007–08 Serie A, he left on loan to Triestina in January 2008 for another Serie B season. The loan was extended in August.

In June 2009 he returned to Calcio Catania after the club acquired the full rights from Atalanta, but was immediately sold back into the Serie B with Sassuolo on 9 July 2009. He announced he would leave the club in January 2011 in order to play more regularly; he joined fellow Serie B team Frosinone on 31 January, rejoining team-mate Gaetano Masucci. Antonio Bocchetti also moved from Frosinone to Sassuolo as part of the deal.

After Frosinone relegated to Lega Pro Prima Divisione, he joined fellow Prima Divisione team Cremonese.

Although he was on the 2012–13 squad, he did not play any games in 2012–13 Lega Pro Prima Divisione.

His contract was renewed on 3 July 2013.

References

External links
 La Gazzetta 2007–08 Profile 
 FIGC Archive 

Italian footballers
Serie A players
Serie B players
Italy youth international footballers
Atalanta B.C. players
Hellas Verona F.C. players
U.C. AlbinoLeffe players
Catania S.S.D. players
U.S. Triestina Calcio 1918 players
Association football defenders
Sportspeople from the Province of Bergamo
1981 births
Living people
Footballers from Lombardy